Ameghino is a mountain in Argentina.

Location 

It is located at Las Heras Department, Mendoza Province, at the Central Andes.

Elevation 

Based on the elevation provided by the available Digital elevation models, SRTM (5931m), SRTM2 (5935m), ASTER (5900m), SRTM filled with ASTER (5935m), TanDEM-X(5956m), Ameghino is about 5950 meters above sea level.

The height of the nearest key col is 5365 meters, so its prominence is 585 meters. Ameghino is listed as mountain, based on the Dominance system  and its dominance is 9.83%. Its parent peak is Aconcagua and the Topographic isolation is 4.4 kilometers. This information was obtained during a research by Suzanne Imber in 2014.

External links 

 Elevation information about Ameghino
 Weather Forecast at Ameghino

Notes 

Five-thousanders of the Andes